Ad serving describes the technology and service that places advertisements on Web sites,   mobile apps, and  Connected TVs. Ad serving technology companies provide software to Web sites and advertisers to serve ads, count them, choose the ads that will make the Web site or advertiser the most money, and monitor the progress of different advertising campaigns. Ad servers are divided into two types—publisher ad servers and advertiser (or a third party) ad servers.

History 
The first central ad server was released by FocaLink Media Services and introduced on July 17, 1995, for controlling the delivery of online advertising or banner ads. Although most contemporary accounts are no longer available online, the Weizmann Institute of Science published an academic research paper documenting the launch of the first ad server. The original motherboard for the first ad server, assembled in June 1995, is also preserved.  FocaLink re-launched the ad server under the name SmartBanner in February 1996. The company was founded by Dave Zinman, Andrew Conru, and Jason Strober, and based in Palo Alto, California. In 1998, the company changed its name to AdKnowledge and was purchased by CMGI in 1999.  The AdKnowledge name was subsequently purchased by a company in Kansas City in 2004, which now operates under the brand name AdKnowledge.

The first local ad server was released by NetGravity in January 1996 for delivering online advertising at major publishing sites such as Yahoo! and Pathfinder. The company was founded by Tom Shields and John Danner, and based in San Mateo, California. In 1998, the company went public on NASDAQ (NETG), and was purchased by DoubleClick in 1999. NetGravity AdServer was then renamed to DART Enterprise. In March 2008 Google acquired DoubleClick. Google has continued to improve and invest in DART Enterprise. The latest version of the product was renamed and shipped as DoubleClick Enterprise 8.0 on September 28, 2011.

Functionality

Common functions 
The common functions of ad serving are as follows; to upload advertisements and rich media, to traffic ads according to differing business rules, to target ads to different users, or content, to tune and to optimize based on results and to report impressions, clicks, post-click and post-impression activities and interaction metrics. All of these functions are an integral part of running an online advertising campaign in making sure that the advertising content is being displayed where and for whom it is intended. It also helps with analysis to see just how effective the campaign is and whether or not the content is generating the desired results.  Ad serving also offers more advanced functions for more sophisticated advertising campaigns. Advanced functions include frequency capping, sequencing ads (also referred to as surround sessions), search engine optimization, and targeting (See Ad targeting and optimization, below). Frequency capping is limiting how many times a user will see the content. Advertisers are also able to limit ads by setting a cap on money-spending.

Ad targeting and optimization 
One aspect of ad-serving technology is automated and semi-automated means of optimizing bid prices, placement, targeting, or other characteristics.  Significant methods include:
 Behavioral targeting — using a profile of prior behavior on the part of the viewer to determine which ad to show during a given visit. For example, targeting car ads on a portal to a viewer that was known to have visited the automotive section of a general media site. 
 Contextual targeting — (also known as Semantic Marketing) refers to the optimum ad placement as a result of analyzing information from the entire Web page where the ad is being served. This concept was introduced as a way of improving the ‘keyword approach' to ad placement were issues surrounding ambiguity in relation to a word's meaning in the prescribed context.  The concept of analyzing the ‘entire' Webpage in order to promote relevant advertising material is to benefit both the viewer of advertising content and the source of the ad. Keywords (or Adwords) are not always relevant in the context in which the word is intended. Therefore, by analyzing the entire page rather than just the keyword, the ambiguity is removed and a more relevant and accurate ad is promoted into the advertising slot on the Web page.
 Creative optimization — using experimental or predictive methods to explore the optimum creative for given ad placement and exploiting that determination in further impressions.

See also
 Affiliate marketing
Ad Exchange
 Contextual advertising
 Digital marketing
 Landing page
 List of advertising networks
 Pay-per-click
 Pay per play
 Website monetization
 View-through rate

References

Internet terminology
 Online advertising